Giants in the Trees is the self-titled debut album by American alternative rock band Giants in the Trees. It features the debut single "Sasquatch", from whose lyrics the band gets its name.

Track listing

References

Giants in the Trees albums
2017 debut albums